The 15th Carrier Air Group of the Fleet Air Arm was formed on 30 June 1945. It was based on the aircraft carrier  for service in the British Pacific Fleet and contained 814 Naval Air Squadron flying the Fairey Barracuda and 1851 Naval Air Squadron flying the Vought F4U Corsair. It was disbanded in 1947.

See also
 List of Fleet Air Arm groups

References

Citations

Bibliography

Fleet Air Arm groups
Military units and formations established in 1945
Military units and formations disestablished in 1947